Marius Bülter (born 29 March 1993) is a German professional footballer who plays as a striker or winger for Bundesliga club Schalke 04.

Career

Early career and Magdeburg
Born in Ibbenbüren, Bülter played for Eintracht Rheine, SuS Neuenkirchen and SV Rödinghausen before signing for 1. FC Magdeburg in the summer of 2018. Over the 2018–19 season, Bülter made 32 appearances, scoring four goals, in a season where Magdeburg would get relegated to the 3. Liga.

Union Berlin
On 4 July 2019, Bülter joined Bundesliga club 1. FC Union Berlin on a season-long loan, with the club having the option to make the transfer permanent at the end of the season. He made his debut for Union in their first Bundesliga appearance: a 4–0 defeat at home to RB Leipzig. His first goals for Union came in a stunning 3–1 victory at home to Borussia Dortmund: The opening and winning goals in Union's first win in the Bundesliga.

Schalke 04
On 26 June 2021, he agreed to join Schalke 04, newly relegated from the Bundesliga, signing a three-year contract.

Career statistics

Honours
Schalke 04
2. Bundesliga: 2021–22

References

External links
 Profile at the FC Schalke 04 website
 
 

1993 births
Living people
People from Ibbenbüren
Sportspeople from Münster (region)
Footballers from North Rhine-Westphalia
German footballers
Association football forwards
SV Rödinghausen players
1. FC Magdeburg players
1. FC Union Berlin players
FC Schalke 04 players
2. Bundesliga players
Regionalliga players
Bundesliga players
FC Eintracht Rheine players